Glycydendron is a genus of plants, under the family Euphorbiaceae first described as a genus in 1922. It is native to South America.

Species
 Glycydendron amazonicum Ducke - French Guinea, Suriname, Guyana, Ecuador, Peru, Bolivia, northwestern Brazil, possibly Colombia
 Glycydendron espiritosantense Kuhlm, - State of Espirito Santo in Brazil

References

Euphorbiaceae genera
Flora of South America
Adenoclineae
Taxa named by Adolpho Ducke